Don Amor (lit: Mister Love) is a Chilean television soap opera created by José Ignacio Valenzuela, that aired on Canal 13 from March 3, to September 1, 2008, starring Ignacia Baeza, Jorge Alberti, Carolina Arregui, Jorge Martínez and Nydia Caro.

Cast

Main characters 
 Ignacia Baeza as Chantal Acevedo.
 Jorge Alberti as Lucián Carvajal.
 Carolina Arregui as Maira Acevedo.
 Jorge Martinez as Angel Carvajal.
 Nydia Caro as Victoria Lausell.

Supporting characters 
 Ernesto Javier as Jason Hernández (alias Jay).
 Awilda Sterling as Virginia Cosme (alias Doña Canga)
 Carlos Marín as Roberto "Tito" Torres (alias Tito).
 Dolores Pedro as Lorna Torres.
 Gabriela Hernández as Cecilia Ovalle.
 Eduardo Barril as Rodolfo.
 Sofía García as Constanza Dreyer.
 Carmina Riego as Beatriz Salas (alias Miss Betty).
 Israel Lugo as Cacho Ortega Jr. (alias Orteguita).
 Catalina Martin as María José Araya.
 Francisco Gormaz as Román Carnevalli.
 Catalina González as Vanesa Rodríguez.
 Cristobal Tapia-Montt as Rodrigo Cifuentes.
 Alfredo Allende as Eugenio Martínez (alias Topo).
 Oscar Guerrero as Pablo Manuel Velásquez.
 Nicolás Alonso as Cristian Flores.
 Carola García as Milagros Santos.
 Joaquín Jarque as Edwin Santana.
 Norwill Fragoso as Shelly Mar Gómez.
 Natalia Rivera as Paola Sierra.
 Jonathan Dwayne as José Carlos López.

Guest appearances 
 Pili Montilla as Isabel.
 María Izquierdo as Patricia.
 Tamara Acosta as Gloria.
 Cristián Campos as Matías.
 Carlos Alberto López.
 Joann Polanco.
 Eddie Torreins.
 Eddie Irizarry.
 Victor Class.
 Marivette Gonzalez.

Reception

Television ratings

References

External links 
 

2008 telenovelas
2008 Chilean television series debuts
2008 Chilean television series endings
Chilean telenovelas
Canal 13 (Chilean TV channel) telenovelas
Spanish-language telenovelas